Oxysdonsaurus is an extinct genus of crocodylid crocodilian. Fossils have been found from the Paraná Basin in Argentina that date back to the Oligocene. According to Edward Drinker Cope, the generic name is a misspelling of the intended name Oxyodontosaurus. The genus is known only from a single tooth and is thus considered indeterminate.

References 

Crocodylidae
Oligocene crocodylomorphs
Oligocene reptiles of South America
Paleogene Argentina
Fossils of Argentina
Paraná Basin
Fossil taxa described in 1890
Prehistoric pseudosuchian genera